Anastasia Yuryevna Zavorotnyuk (born April 3, 1971) is a Russian actress and television presenter. She is best known for her lead role on My Fair Nanny (2004–2009).

Early life and education
Anastasia Zavorotnyuk was born on April 3, 1971, in Astrakhan. Her mother, People's Artist of Russia's Valentina Borisovna Zavorotnyuk, worked in the Astrakhan Youth Theatre. Her father, Yuri Zavorotnyuk, worked on television, and was a member of the Academy of Russian Television. Even from early childhood, Anastasia decided to play in the theater and insist on her dream: in her spare time making music and dancing, took part in the dance ensemble "Lotus". She received lessons at the Moscow Art Theatre. In 1991, she took part in her first film playing Masha.

Career
After graduating from the Moscow Art Theatre School in 1993, she and became and actress under the direction of Oleg Tabakov. Over 10 years in the theatre, she had been in 29 productions. She is famous for her role in My Fair Nanny, which is a remake of the U.S. series The Nanny. She called and was offered the series, which she had no idea. Her Ukrainian accent is borrowed from Olga Block Mirimskoy, a colleague at the theater.

In addition to acting, Anastasia acts as a presenter. In 2005, she replaced Tina Kandelaki on the program "Good Song" on the TRK Ukraine. She also participated in the first season of "Two Stars" with Mikhail Boyarsky and came in 2nd place.

Personal life
Zavorotnyuk has been married three times. Her first marriage was to a German businessman but lasted only one year. Her second marriage was to Dmitry Striukove, with whom she opened a real estate agency. They had two children, Anna and Michael.

From 2006 to 2008 she dated actor and co-star on My Fair Nanny Sergey Zhigunov.

On September 22, 2008, she married figure skater Peter Tchernyshev at the Foros Church in Crimea.

In September 2019, Zavorotnyuk was reported to have been diagnosed with brain cancer stage IV around the time of giving birth to her daughter, Mila, in October 2018, with rumours of her diagnosis dating back as early as August 2019 when fans had noticed a scar on her neck which, as was theorised, might suggest a biopsy to test for cancer. To date, all information concerning her health remains unclear, since Zavorotnyuk's family has neither denied nor confirmed her diagnosis and current condition all the while information of different degrees of reliability has appeared in the press. Zavorotnyuk herself has not made any statement since, and has not been seen in public for some time.

Filmography

Television

References

External links

International web page of Anastasiya Zavorotnyuk!
Anastasiya Zavorotnyuk — Russian web site
Anastasia Zavorotnyuk at the Forbes
Anastasia Zavorotnyuk bio at Lifeactor.ru 

1971 births
Living people
People from Astrakhan
Russian film actresses
Russian television actresses
Russian stage actresses
Honored Artists of the Russian Federation
Russian people of Ukrainian descent
Moscow Art Theatre School alumni